Miranda is a comune (municipality) in the Province of Isernia in the Italian region Molise, located about  northwest of Campobasso and about  north of Isernia.

Miranda borders the following municipalities: Carovilli, Isernia, Pesche, Pescolanciano, Roccasicura, Sessano del Molise.

Demographic evolution

References

External links

Cities and towns in Molise